Kersy Katrak (1936–2008) was an Indian Parsi advertising personality and poet of the 1970s.   He revolutionized Indian advertising, great leeway to creatives, and managed to attract an enormous talent pool including
Ajit Balakrishnan, Sudarshan Dheer, Veeru Hiremath, Ravi Gupta,
Panna Jain, Arun Kale, Anil Kapoor, Mohammed Khan, Arun Kolatkar, Arun Nanda, Sunder Kaula
and Kiran Nagarkar.

He wrote two collections of verse, 
A Journal of the Way and 
Diversions by the Wayside, in 1969, and was anthologized in several collections.

References

1936 births
2008 deaths
Indian advertising people
20th-century Indian poets
English-language poets from India
Parsi people